"In the Air" is a single by British pop rapper Chipmunk, released as the second single from his second studio album Transition (2011). The song features American R&B singer Keri Hilson, and was released on 13 March 2011. "In the Air" followed up the rapper's hit single "Champion", featuring American R&B singer Chris Brown, which peaked at number 2 in the UK Singles Chart.

Background
Speaking in April 2011 to noted UK urban writer Pete Lewis - assistant editor of Blues & Soul - Chipmunk described how the single came about: "I've had a love for Keri Hilson since her first album. I feel she is an amazing artist, and an amazing songwriter - plus her swag is on Level Infinity! And, though she was originally meant to be on a different track, when she came to the studio and heard 'In The Air' she straightaway said that was the one she wanted to be a part of!... So we made it HAPPEN! And to me the song represents like the perfect balance of me keeping it credible but at the same time commercial."

Music video
The song's accompanying music video was directed by Colin Tilley, who also directed Hilson's "One Night Stand" music video. The video was released on 31 March 2011. It features appearances by both Chipmunk and Hilson.

Charts

Release history

References

2011 singles
Chipmunk (rapper) songs
Keri Hilson songs
Songs written by Keri Hilson
Music videos directed by Colin Tilley
2011 songs
Songs written by Harmony Samuels
Jive Records singles
Song recordings produced by Harmony Samuels
Songs written by Eric Bellinger